The Master in Information System Management, also known as Masters in Management Information Systems or Master of Science in Information System Management is a professional Master's degree in Information Systems, Information Technology, Computer Science and Management. The degree is also known as Master of Science in Information Management or Master of Information Systems with curriculum overlap (abbreviated M.ISM, MS.IM, M.IS or similar), although MISM, MMIS and MSISM have significantly more business/management content than Masters in IS.

Curriculum

Though unique to each degree-granting institution, an MISM will often include most, if not all, of the following:
 
Information systems modeling
Information System – Concepts (data, information, System Modeling) Functional components of computer;
Project management
Databases
Computer networks
Economics & Statistics
Business concepts
Electives

References

Information technology qualifications
Information System Management